Ulrica Messing (born 31 January 1968 in Hällefors) is a Swedish Social Democratic former politician. She was Minister for Communications and Regional Policy in the Ministry of Industry, Employment and Communications from 2000 to 2006.

From October 2006 to September 2007 she was chairman of the Riksdag Committee for Defence. She resigned from the Riksdag on September 18, 2007. She left politics in 2008.

Political career 
Messing completed high school in 1987. She began her political career in the Swedish Social Democratic Youth League and was a member of the Municipal Council in Hofors Municipality from 1989. In 1991 she was elected to the Riksdag as a Member of Parliament. From 1993 she has been a member of the National Board of the Swedish Social Democratic Party.

In 1996 Prime Minister Göran Persson made her a minister. She first served in the Ministry of Labour, from 1998 in the Ministry of Culture, and from 2000 in the Ministry of Industry, Employment and Communications.

During her time as Minister for Communications, Ministry of Industry, Employment and Communications from 2000 to 2006 she was in charge of Swedish arms exports. During her tenure the volume of Sweden's arms exports grew to become the ninth largest in the world (2005). It increased from 4,4 billion SEK in 2000 to 8,6 billion SEK in 2006. One arms deal during this time that attracted particular criticism was when the Swedish company SAAB exported airplanes to the Pakistan military in a deal worth 8,3 billion SEK, about 1,2 billion USD.

Personal life 
She is living with multimillionaire Torsten Jansson in Gothenburg. In 2008 Messing opened a design store called Porthouse Interior in Gothenburg.

References

External links
Information page on the Swedish Government web site

1968 births
Living people
People from Hällefors Municipality
Members of the Riksdag from the Social Democrats
Swedish Ministers for Gender Equality
Swedish Ministers for Infrastructure
Women members of the Riksdag
Women government ministers of Sweden
Members of the Riksdag 2002–2006
21st-century Swedish women politicians